Katyn-Tau is a summit in the central part of the Greater Caucasus Mountain Range (Bezengi Wall). It lies on the border of Svaneti (Mestia Municipality, Georgia) and Kabardino-Balkaria (Russia). The elevation of the mountain is 4979 m (16,335 ft) above sea level. The mountain is made up of paleozoic granites. The slopes of summit are covered nival landscape.

References

Mountains of Georgia (country)
Mountains of Kabardino-Balkaria
Four-thousanders of the Caucasus